ATP-dependent RNA helicase DDX19B is an enzyme that in humans is encoded by the DDX19B gene.

DEAD box proteins, characterized by the conserved motif Asp-Glu-Ala-Asp (DEAD), are putative RNA helicases. They are implicated in a number of cellular processes involving alteration of RNA secondary structure such as translation initiation, nuclear and mitochondrial splicing, and ribosome and spliceosome assembly. Based on their distribution patterns, some members of this family are believed to be involved in embryogenesis, spermatogenesis, and cellular growth and division. This gene encodes a DEAD box protein, which exhibits RNA-dependent ATPase and ATP-dependent RNA-unwinding activities. This protein is recruited to the cytoplasmic fibrils of the nuclear pore complex, where it participates in the export of mRNA from the nucleus. Multiple alternatively spliced transcript variants encoding different isoforms have been found for this gene.

References

Further reading